The men's 100 metres at the 2018 IAAF World U20 Championships was held at Ratina Stadium on 10 and 11 July.

Records

Results

Heats
Qualification: First 3 of each heat (Q) and the 6 fastest times (q) qualified for the semifinals.

Wind:Heat 1: +1.1 m/s, Heat 2: +0.6 m/s, Heat 3: +0.5 m/s, Heat 4: -0.3 m/s, Heat 5: -1.0 m/s, Heat 6: +0.2 m/s

Semifinals

Qualification: First 2 of each semifinal (Q) and the 2 fastest times (q) qualified for the final.

Wind:Semifinal 1: +1.0 m/s, Semifinal 2: +1.4 m/s, Semifinal 3: +0.1 m/s

Final

Wind: +1.2 m/s

References

100 metres
100 metres at the World Athletics U20 Championships